BFD may refer to:

Agencies
 Bakersfield Fire Department, Bakersfield, California
 Boston Fire Department, Boston, Massachusetts
 Brooklyn Fire Department (former), Brooklyn, New York
 Buffalo Fire Department, Buffalo, New York

Computing
 Bidirectional Forwarding Detection, a network protocol used to detect faults between devices
 Binary File Descriptor library, the GNU Project's main mechanism for the portable manipulation of object files in a variety of formats
 Binary Format Description language, an extension of XSIL
 A virtual music instrument meant to simulate a drumset, released by FXpansion

Media
 Benelux Film Distributors, a joint venture of various independent film distributors
 BFD, an annual alternative music festival hosted by the radio station Live 105

Transportation
 Bakersfield (Amtrak station), California (Amtrak station code)
 Bradford Regional Airport, Bradford, Pennsylvania (IATA airport code)
 Brentford railway station, London, England (National Rail station code)

Other
 Back focal distance or back focal length, in optics
 Bafut language (ISO 639 alpha-3 code: bfd)
 BFD Energy Challenger, a professional tennis tournament in Rome, Italy
 Boiler feedwater pump, a type of pump used to pump feedwater into a steam boiler
 Bounded factorization domain, a particular kind of atomic domain
 Budgerigar fledgling disease, a virus, frequently fatal to caged birds
 Bund Freier Demokraten, the German acronym for Association of Free Democrats
 Bundesfreiwilligendienst or Federal volunteers service, Germany
 Conker's Bad Fur Day, a 2001 video game